Officieuse was a storeship launched on 3 August 1776. The French Royal Navy lent her to the Compagnie de Guyane in September. She completed four voyages for the Compagnie, before wrecking on the fifth.
January to July 1777: Le Havre, Tenerife, Gorée, Juda, Île du Prince (possibly Prince Edward Island, Cap-Français, Le Havre
July 1778 to 1779: Rochefort, Lorient, Gorée, Groix, Guyanne, Rochefort
August 1779 to end-1779: Rochefort to Senegal and return
March 1780 to November: Rochefort to Guyane and return

During this last voyage she captured the British merchant vessel Arlequin (probably Harlequin), off Cayenne. However, in 1781 the British recaptured her. The captor was possibly , which captured the brig Harlequin on 7 December 1781.

In June 1781, Officeuse left Bordeaux for Senegal. In November she wrecked while crossing the bar at Casamance to escape , under Captain Thomas Shirley. Shirley reported that Officeuse was supposed to be worth £30,000.

Citations

References
Demerliac, Alain (1996) La Marine De Louis XVI: Nomenclature Des Navires Français De 1774 À 1792. (Nice: Éditions OMEGA). 

1776 ships
Maritime incidents in 1781
Age of Sail ships of France
Ships built in France